The Catholic Church in Canada comprises
 a Latin Church hierarchy, consisting of eighteen ecclesiastical provinces each headed by a metropolitan archbishop, with a total of 54 suffragan dioceses, each headed by a bishop, and a non-metropolitan archbishopric, plus a military ordinariate (including 14 auxiliary bishops, for a total of 79 bishops).
 a Ukrainian Catholic ecclesiastical province, comprising a metropolitan archeparchy and four suffragan eparchies
 six single jurisdictions for other Eastern Catholic Churches.   
Those bishops all belong to the Canadian episcopal conference, the Canadian Conference of Catholic Bishops (C.C.C.B., HQ in national capital Ottawa).

Three Eastern Catholic churches have US-based North American jurisdictions covering Canada, as does the Latin Personal Ordinariate of the Chair of Saint Peter for former Anglicans headquartered in the US.

There also in an Apostolic Nunciature to Canada as papal diplomatic (embassy-level) representation.

Current Latin Provinces and Dioceses

Latin sui iuris jurisdictions 
The following particular churches are not suffragan to metropolitan sees, but are instead immediately subject to the Holy See:
 The Archdiocese of Winnipeg (not Metropolitan) is an independent Latin Church district, serving southwestern portions of Manitoba. 
 The Military Ordinariate of Canada serves Canadian servicemen abroad and is not defined by geographical territory.
 The Personal Ordinariate of the Chair of Saint Peter serves Catholics of the Anglican Use in both Canada and the United States.

Ecclesiastical province of Edmonton 
The province geographically consists of the majority of Alberta, except for the province's northwestern corner.

 Metropolitan Archdiocese of Edmonton
 Diocese of Calgary
 Diocese of Saint Paul in Alberta

Ecclesiastical province of Gatineau 
The province geographically consists of the western third of Quebec.

 Metropolitan Archdiocese of Gatineau
 Diocese of Amos
 Diocese of Mont-Laurier
 Diocese of Rouyn-Noranda

Ecclesiastical province of Grouard-McLennan 
The province geographically consists of the entirety of Yukon Territory and the Northwest Territories, plus the northwestern corner of Alberta, the western third of Nunavut, and a tiny portion of northern Saskatchewan.

 Metropolitan Archdiocese of Grouard-McLennan
 Diocese of Mackenzie-Fort Smith
 Diocese of Whitehorse

Ecclesiastical province of Halifax-Yarmouth 
The province is geographically conterminous with the provinces of Nova Scotia and Prince Edward Island.

 Metropolitan Archdiocese of Halifax-Yarmouth
 Diocese of Antigonish
 Diocese of Charlottetown

Ecclesiastical province of Keewatin-Le Pas 
The province geographically consists of the northern half of Manitoba, the northern third of Saskatchewan, the eastern two-thirds of Nunavut, and a portion of northwestern Ontario.

 Metropolitan Archdiocese of Keewatin-Le Pas
 Diocese of Churchill-Baie d'Hudson

Ecclesiastical province of Kingston 
The province geographically consists of central and parts of eastern Ontario.

 Metropolitan Archdiocese of Kingston
 Diocese of Peterborough
 Diocese of Sault Sainte Marie

Ecclesiastical province of Moncton 
The province is geographically coterminous with the province of New Brunswick.

 Metropolitan Archdiocese of Moncton
 Diocese of Bathurst
 Diocese of Edmundston
 Diocese of Saint John in New Brunswick

Ecclesiastical province of Montréal 
The province geographically consists of south-central portions of Quebec.

 Metropolitan Archdiocese of Montréal
 Diocese of Joliette
 Diocese of Saint-Jean-Longueuil
 Diocese of Saint-Jérôme
 Diocese of Valleyfield

Ecclesiastical province of Ottawa-Cornwall 
The province geographically consists of northeastern and parts of eastern Ontario.

 Metropolitan Archdiocese of Ottawa-Cornwall
 Diocese of Hearst–Moosonee
 Diocese of Pembroke
 Diocese of Timmins

Ecclesiastical province of Québec 
The province geographically consists of north-central portions of Quebec.

 Metropolitan Archdiocese of Québec
 Diocese of Chicoutimi
 Diocese of Sainte-Anne-de-la-Pocatière
 Diocese of Trois Rivières

Ecclesiastical province of Regina 
The province geographically consists of the southern two-thirds of Saskatchewan.

 Metropolitan Archdiocese of Regina
 Diocese of Prince Albert
 Diocese of Saskatoon

Ecclesiastical province of Rimouski 
The province geographically consists of northeastern portions of Quebec.

 Metropolitan Archdiocese of Rimouski
 Diocese of Baie-Comeau
 Diocese of Gaspé

Ecclesiastical province of Saint Boniface 
The province geographically consists of the southeastern portion of Manitoba.

 Archdiocese of Saint Boniface

Ecclesiastical province of St. John's 
The province is geographically coterminous with the province of Newfoundland and Labrador.

 Metropolitan Archdiocese of St. John's, Newfoundland
 Diocese of Corner Brook and Labrador
 Diocese of Grand Falls

Ecclesiastical province of Sherbrooke 
The province geographically consists of portions of southeastern Quebec.

 Metropolitan Archdiocese of Sherbrooke
 Diocese of Nicolet
 Diocese of Saint-Hyacinthe

Ecclesiastical province of Toronto 
The province geographically consists of southern and portions of northwestern Ontario.

 Metropolitan Archdiocese of Toronto
 Diocese of Hamilton
 Diocese of London
 Diocese of Saint Catharines
 Diocese of Thunder Bay

Ecclesiastical province of Vancouver 
The province is geographically coterminous with the province of British Columbia except for the northernmost portion of B.C. above 57 degrees latitude.

 Metropolitan Archdiocese of Vancouver
 Diocese of Kamloops
 Diocese of Nelson
 Diocese of Prince George
 Diocese of Victoria

Current Eastern Catholic province and dioceses 
These belong to particular churches sui iuris, which use a non-Latin rite (Byzantine or other) but are in full communion with Rome and the entirety of the Catholic Church, yet have their own patriarch or other hierarch directly under Rome

Metropolia of Winnipeg (Ukrainian Catholic) 
The Ukrainian Greek Catholic Church in Canada, a particular church, using the Byzantine Rite in both the Ukrainian language and local vernacular, is organized into a metropolia (or ecclesiastical province) consisting of a metropolitan archeparchy (archdiocese) and its four suffragan eparchies (dioceses) :
 Metropolitan Archeparchy of Winnipeg
 Eparchy of Edmonton
 Eparchy of New Westminster
 Eparchy of Saskatoon
 Eparchy of Toronto and Eastern Canada

Other Eastern Catholic dioceses in Canada 
 Chaldean Catholic Eparchy of Mar Addai of Toronto, part of the Chaldean Catholic Church
 Maronite Catholic Eparchy of Saint Maron of Montreal, part of the Maronite Church
 Melkite Catholic Eparchy of Saint-Sauveur of Montréal, part of the Melkite Greek Catholic Church
 Syro-Malabar Catholic Eparchy of Mississauga, part of the Syro-Malabar Catholic Church
 Syrian Catholic Apostolic Exarchate for Canada, part of the Syriac Catholic Church
 Slovakian Catholic Exarchate of Saints Cyril and Methodius of Toronto, part of the Byzantine Catholic Metropolitan Church of Pittsburgh, USA (formerly part of the Slovakian Greek Catholic Church).

International Eastern Catholic jurisdictions
Several Eastern Catholic Churches have jurisdictions that include members and congregations in both the United States and Canada:
Armenian Catholic Eparchy of Our Lady of Nareg in Glendale, part of the Armenian Catholic Church
Syro-Malankara Catholic Eparchy of the United States of America and Canada, part of the Syro-Malankara Catholic Church
Romanian Catholic Eparchy of St George's in Canton, part of the Romanian Greek Catholic Church

Former jurisdictions

Titular see 
 Roman Catholic Diocese of Gravelbourg

Other suppressed jurisdictions 
Nearly all other former jurisdictions have direct successors, usually after promotion, except :
 Apostolic Prefecture of Placentia, suppressed (merged into Diocese of St. John’s, Newfoundland)
 Territorial Abbacy of Saint Peter–Muenster, suppressed (merged into Diocese of Saskatoon)
 Diocese of Labrador City–Schefferville, suppressed (merged into Diocese of Amos, Diocese of Baie-Comeau and Diocese of Corner Brook and Labrador)
 Diocese of Harbour Grace, suppressed (merged into Diocese of Grand Falls)
 Diocese of Moosonee, suppressed (merged with the Diocese of Hearst, to create the new Diocese of Hearst–Moosonee)
 Diocese of Yarmouth, suppressed (merged into Metropolitan Archdiocese of Halifax, which simultaneously became Metropolitan Archdiocese of Halifax–Yarmouth)
 Diocese of Alexandria-Cornwall, suppressed (merged into Metropolitan Archdiocese of Ottawa, which simultaneously became Metropolitan Archdiocese of Ottawa-Cornwall)
 Diocese of St. George's, suppressed (merged into Diocese of Corner Brook and Labrador)

Gallery of Archdiocesan sees

See also 

 Canadian Conference of Catholic Bishops
 Catholicism in Canada
 List of Catholic dioceses (structured view)
 List of dioceses of the Anglican Church of Canada

Sources and external links 
 GCatholic.org - data for all sections
 Catholic-Hierarchy entry
 CanadaMassTimes.org

References

Canada
Catholic dioceses